Anatoly Leopoldovich Yakobson (born 22 August 1906) was a Soviet archaeologist, historian of art and architecture.

He was a Doctor of Historical Sciences (1961) and member of the Institute of Archeology of the USSR Academy of Sciences.

Early life and education 
Anatoly Yakobson was born in the family of a forester. In 1922 he entered the Faculty of Physics and Mathematics of Moscow University, two years later he transferred to the archaeological department of the Faculty of Ethnology. In 1927, Yakobson moved to live in Leningrad, where he studied at the Faculty of Linguistics and the History of Material Culture of Leningrad University. In 1929 he graduated from Leningrad University. 

In 1941 he defended his Ph.D. thesis on the topic "Architecture of medieval Chersonese".

Career 
Since 1930, he worked in Leningrad, at the State Academy of the History of Material Culture, which in 1937 became part of the USSR Academy of Sciences as the Institute of the History of Material Culture named after Nikolai Marr. In 1943, the Institute was transferred to Moscow, and its branch remained in Leningrad.

Anatoly Yakobson endured the Siege of Leningrad. After being evacuated to Ivanovo, he moved to Moscow and was hired by the Moscow branch of the Institute of the History of Material Culture.

In 1945, he transferred to the Leningrad branch of the same institute, where he worked until the end of his life.

His research interests are: Eastern Europe in the Middle Ages, the Northern Black Sea region and Transcaucasia. He carried out large-scale excavations in the Crimea (Tauric Chersonesus, etc.).

He is the author of more than 60 scientific works, including "Essays on the history of Armenian architecture in the 5th-17th centuries" (1950).

Scientific activity 
Anatoly Yakobson took part in archaeological expeditions in Old Crimea, Sudak, Chersonese.

In 1936, he participated in the excavations of Amberd Castle in Armenia.

In the 1930s he took part in the work of the Tsimlyansk expedition.

Yakobson participated in an expedition to the Mangup settlement led by E.V. Weimarn, M.A. Tikhanova and A.L. Jacobson.

Main works

Awards 
 Order of the Red Banner of Labour
 Honorary Diploma of the Supreme Soviet of the Armenian SSR

Literature 
  Anatoly Leopoldovich Yakobson (1906—1984): Necrologue // . Vol. 46 (71). P. 282—283. (in Russian)

References

External sources 
 Tikhonov I. L. Anatoly Leopoldovich Yakobson // Saint Petersburg State University (in Russian)

1906 births
1984 deaths
Saint Petersburg State University alumni
Recipients of the Order of the Red Banner of Labour
Soviet archaeologists
Soviet historians
Architectural historians